Bienvenido Estudillo Laguesma (born October 3, 1950 in Santa Cruz, Manila) is a Filipino government official, lawyer and businessman who is currently the  Secretary of Labor and Employment since June 30, 2022.

Education
Laguesma attended the Lyceum of the Philippines University where he obtained a bachelor's degree in political science in 1971. He then attended the Ateneo de Manila University where he graduated with a law degree in 1975. He entered the Royal Institute of Public Administration as a Colombo Scholar and took up an administration course in 1985. He also finished a CES Development Program at the Development Academy of the Philippines in 1984.

Career

Government
Laguesma started working at the Ministry of Labor and Employment (now Department of Labor and Employment; DOLE) in the 1970s during the presidency of Ferdinand Marcos. Starting as a labor arbiter, he rose up through the ranks within the ministry. He served as DOLE Undersecretary from 1990 to 1996 spanning the presidencies of Corazon Aquino and Fidel V. Ramos. From 1996 to 1998, Laguesma was Presidential Assistant for Ramos. He would then serve as Secretary of the Department of Labor and Employment (DOLE) from 1998 to 2001 during the administration of President Joseph Estrada.

He was also the commissioner of the Social Security System (Philippines) during President Benigno Aquino III's term.

He was offered to reprise his role as DOLE Secretary by president-elect Bongbong Marcos. He was initially reluctant citing his age but accepted Marcos' offer.

Other
Laguesma runs his own private law firm and was the director of Philex Mining Corporation and the First Metro Investment Corporation.

References

|-

1950 births
Benigno Aquino III administration personnel
Secretaries of Labor and Employment of the Philippines
Living people
20th-century Filipino lawyers
Lyceum of the Philippines University alumni
Ateneo de Manila University alumni
Estrada administration cabinet members
Bongbong Marcos administration cabinet members